Handré Pollard (born 11 March 1994) is a South African professional rugby union player who currently plays for the South Africa national team and Leicester Tigers in England's Premiership Rugby. His regular playing positions are fly-half, where he started for South Africa in their 2019 Rugby World Cup Final win, and inside-centre.

Rugby career

Youth
Pollard earned a provincial call-up as early as primary school level, when he was selected in the  squad for the Under-13 Craven Week competition in 2007. He also represented them at the Under-16 Grant Khomo Week in 2010, before playing at the Under-18 Craven Week competitions in 2011 and 2012.

Professional career

Bulls / Blue Bulls / UP

2012–13
His first involvement in rugby in Pretoria came for university side  during the 2013 Varsity Cup competition. He did not play in the first match of the season, but then made three substitute appearances in their next three matches before being selected in the run-on side for their last three matches in the round-robin stage, the semi-final and the final, starting all those matches as inside centre. He was the main kicker for the UP Tuks team and scored 68 points in his side's run to the final, making him the tournament's second-highest points scorer behind 's Kobus de Kock. He was also a key player in the final of the competition as he kicked five conversions and a penalty to contribute 17 points in UP Tuks' 44–5 victory as they retained the trophy they won in 2012 Varsity Cup.

During the 2013 Varsity Cup season, Pollard was also included in the  side that participated in the 2013 Vodacom Cup competition. He came off the bench in the 62nd minute and scored two late conversions in their 40–32 victory. He scored eleven points, but could not prevent his side slipping to a 31–34 defeat.

In June 2013, after signing a contract extension to keep him at the  until 2017, Pollard was also named in their Currie Cup side for the 2013 Currie Cup Premier Division season. Despite getting his first Currie Cup points after just six minutes – converting an Akona Ndungane try – the Blue Bulls suffered a 34–18 defeat in that match. Pollard started a total of six matches in this competition, scoring 62 points to finish as the Blue Bulls' top points scorer in the competition and eighth overall and also made four appearances for the  side in the 2013 Under-21 Provincial Championship, scoring 52 points.

2014
Pollard had an eventful match, being sent to the sin-bin in the first half and contributing ten points with the boot as the Bulls ran out 26–21 winners.

2015
In 2015, Pollard extended his contract with the Blue Bulls until the end of the 2019 season.

NTT Docomo Red Hurricanes Osaka
In June 2015, the Blue Bulls announced that Pollard would join Japanese Top League side NTT DoCoMo Red Hurricanes Osaka on a three-month deal between November 2015 and January 2016 for the 2015–16 Top League season, but would return to the Bulls prior to the 2016 Super Rugby season. This was later confirmed by the Japanese side.

Montpellier
In May 2019, the Blue Bulls confirmed that Pollard would join Top 14 side  after the 2019 Rugby World Cup, having expressed his desire to continue his playing career in France during discussions about the renewal of his contract. After announcing his departure Pollard continued to feature for Montpellier, eventually featuring from the bench as they won their first ever French championship in a 29-10 win over Castres in the final.

Leicester Tigers
In December 2021, Leicester Tigers confirmed they had signed Pollard from Top 14 side  at the end of the 2021/22 season. Pollard joined Tigers following the departure of George Ford to Sale Sharks.  Pollard made his Leicester debut as a replacement on 1 October 2022 in a 51-18 defeat to Saracens.

International career

South Africa Schools
Pollard was included in a South African Schools side in 2012, where he scored 37 points in three appearances against France, Wales and England.

South Africa Under-20

2012 Junior World Championship
Pollard earned a call-up to the South African Under-20 team that won the 2012 IRB Junior World Championship on home soil. Despite not playing in their first match against Ireland, he started their remaining four matches. He kicked five conversions in their match against Italy and four conversions in their match against England to help secure a semi-final berth for South Africa. Three conversions and two penalties followed in their 35–3 semi-final victory over Argentina to see the Baby Boks through to their first ever final against four-time champions New Zealand. Once again, the boot of Pollard was largely responsible for their 22–16 victory in the final as he kicked four penalties and a drop-goal to lift the trophy for South Africa for the first time. Pollard finished as fourth top scorer overall in the competition with 42 points.

2013 Junior World Championship
Pollard was included in a training group that toured Argentina in preparation for the 2013 IRB Junior World Championship before being included in the final squad for the 2013 IRB Junior World Championship in France. Playing at inside centre, Pollard's kicking let him down in their 97–0 demolition of the United States in their opening match, scoring a penalty and one conversion out of six attempts before the kicking duties passed to Robert du Preez. He did not kick at all in their match against England, but a switch back to fly-half for their final match against hosts France saw Pollard contribute eleven points with the boot as they won the match 26–19 to top their pool and qualify for a semi-final against Wales. Wales scored an 18–17 victory over the defending champions in their semi-final match with Pollard scoring seven points. He rounded off his tournament by kicking a penalty and four conversions in the third-placed play-off match against New Zealand to finish the tournament with 34 points.

2014 Junior World Championship
Pollard was included in a South Africa Under-20 squad for the third time for the 2014 IRB Junior World Championship, and also named captain of the side. As first-choice fly-half and kicker, this tournament proved to be Pollard's most prolific. He kicked seven conversions in their 61–5 victory over Scotland in their opening match. Three penalties, two conversions and his first ever try in the Junior World Championships helped South Africa record a 33–24 victory over New Zealand in their second pool match and he kicked three conversions as South Africa clinched their third consecutive semi-final place with a 21–8 victory over Samoa.

They faced New Zealand again in the semi-final and Pollard helped South Africa secure their fourth consecutive victory over the Baby Blacks. He opened the scoring for South Africa with a 20th-minute try and also scored three conversions and two penalties in a 32–25 victory. He scored a further ten points in the final as South Africa lost 20–21 to England to finish runners-up in the competition.

Pollard was also briefly the leading points scorer in the history of the competition. During the semi-final matches, both Pollard (with 131 points) and Argentina's Patricio Fernández broke the record previously held by England's Tom Homer. However, the 26 points scored by Fernández in their 9th-place play-off match against Scotland meant that he became the new record holder with a total of 155 points, with Pollard in second place with 141 points.

Pollard's performances also earned him a nomination for the 2014 Young Player of the Year award, alongside Nathan Earle, Tevita Li and Garry Ringrose. At the conclusion of the tournament, Pollard was announced as the winner of the award.

Senior international rugby
At the conclusion of the 2014 IRB Junior World Championship, Pollard was called up to the senior Springbok squad for their final match of the 2014 incoming tours series against . With Springbok fly-halves Patrick Lambie and Johan Goosen both injured and Morné Steyn withdrawn from the squad by French club side Stade Français, Pollard was named as the starting fly-half for their match against Scotland. He subsequently made his international debut on 28 June 2014 in Port Elizabeth, contributing thirteen points (five conversions and a penalty) to help South Africa convincingly win the match 55–6.

A few weeks later, Pollard was included in a 30-man squad named by Springbok coach Heyneke Meyer for the 2014 Rugby Championship. He was named as the fly-half for the run-on side in their opening match of the competition against  at Loftus Versfeld; within two minutes of making his Rugby Championship debut, he scored his first points in this competition by converting Ruan Pienaar's early try. He also scored a penalty a few minutes later to help the Springboks to a 13–6 victory. He was the starting fly-half in five of the Springboks' six matches during the competition – Morné Steyn starting their match against  in Perth – and was a key player in the Springboks' final match of the competition. 
In particular he scored two tries (his first at international level) and kicked a further nine points as the Springboks beat  27–25 in Johannesburg, to help end New Zealand's 22-match unbeaten run dating back almost two years and their first ever defeat in The Rugby Championship competition since its expansion in 2012. He scored a total of 43 points in the competition, in joint second place with Australian Bernard Foley on the point scoring list and nine points behind tournament top scorer, Argentina's Nicolás Sánchez.

A knee ligament injury in February 2016 caused Pollard to miss most of 2016.

Pollard was named in South Africa's squad for the 2019 Rugby World Cup. South Africa went on to win the tournament for the third time, and Pollard was the tournament's leading points scorer. After missing a penalty attempt in the second minute of the final, Pollard thereafter converted six penalty kicks, missed an eighth attempt, but then converted two tries for a personal haul of 22 points. During the final, Pollard sustained a fractured eye socket, and although he played out the game, his subsequent hospitalization forced him to miss the first four days of the team's trophy tour, but was able to join for the final leg of the tour in Cape Town.

Personal life
Pollard is married to Marise (née Malherbe), a South African athlete who also hails from Paarl.

Springbok statistics

Test match record
Pollard's test match record is as follows:

Pld = Games Played, W = Games Won, D = Games Drawn, L = Games Lost, Tri = Tries Scored, Con = Conversions, Pen = Penalties, DG = Drop Goals, Pts = Points Scored

International tries

Notes

References

External links
 

Springbok Rugby Hall of Fame profile

South African rugby union players
South Africa international rugby union players
Living people
1994 births
People from Somerset West
Rugby union fly-halves
Alumni of Paarl Gimnasium
Blue Bulls players
Bulls (rugby union) players
White South African people
South Africa Under-20 international rugby union players
NTT DoCoMo Red Hurricanes Osaka players
South African expatriate rugby union players
South African expatriate sportspeople in Japan
South African people of English descent
Expatriate rugby union players in Japan
Rugby union players from the Western Cape
Montpellier Hérault Rugby players